Billain (born Adis Kutkut) is a Bosnian drum and bass producer, DJ and sound designer from Sarajevo. He is mostly known for his distinctive style within the neurofunk genre and his collaborations with Frenkie and Edo Maajka.

Career
Billain was influenced as a pre-teen by the Bosnian War. During the four-year-long Siege of Sarajevo he began to draw and later discovered graffiti and created his first hip hop productions.

In search of new possibilities to express his feelings originating in the siege, at first Billain taught himself how to produce techno music and later neurofunk. Before he released his first music, Billain joined the drum and bass collective Kontra which organised many drum and bass events in Sarajevo with Djs like Matrix & Optical, Teebee, Stakka & Skynet and Konflict. His music has been played on BBC Radio 1 and has been featured on UKF Music.

In 2014, Billain, alongside composer Sloven Anzulović, created and composed the sound design and music for the re-opening ceremony of the 1992 destroyed and now rebuilt National and University Library of Bosnia and Herzegovina.

In 2018, Kutkut designed sounds for the movies Pacific Rim Uprising and Hunter Killer and created the soundtrack of the horror game Scorn.

Billain also releases shortfilms about technological singularity and artificial intelligence. With his side project Aethek, he drifts towards the genre of Noise music, only focusing on sound design instead of melody and rhythm.

Discography

Albums 
 Nomad's Revenge (2019, Renraku Global Media)
 Lands Unbreached (2022, Renraku Global Media)

EPs
 Broken Universe EP (2010, Citrus Recordings), with Future Signal
 Kontra EP (2011, Citrus Recordings)
 #DNA EP (2014, Fmjam Records), with Frenkie
 Colossus EP (2014, Bad Taste Recordings)
 Binary Volume 3 (2014, Critical Music)
 Colonize EP (2015, Eatbrain)
 1991 VG (2017, Renraku Global Media) as Aethek

Singles
 Rhyno / Intrusion (2008, Breed 12 Inches), Rhyno by Receptor
 Glome / The Solution (2010, Fatality Recordings), The Solution by High Maintenance
 Coded (2011, Close 2 Death Recordings), on Blood Money LP Part 1
 Phalando / Away we go (2011, Close 2 Death Recordings), Away we go by Para
 Pranksters / Li (2011, Citrus Recordings), Pranksters by Dabs
 Probes / Horus 8 (2011, Syndrome Audio)
 Soulmatter (2011, Rise Audio), on Rise Audio EP
 Total Darkness / Fiber Twist (2012, Rise Audio)
 God Ribs (2012, Rise Audio), on RA004 EP
 Batbots / Manifold (2012, Bad Taste Recordings)
 Blockfield / Boogie (2013, Bad Taste Recordings)
 Supertensor / Equilateral (2013, Mindtech Recordings), Equilateral by Allied
 Wizard (2014, Bad Taste Recordings), with Teddy Killerz on Machine Room Level Two
 Device Nine (2014, Rise Audio), on RA010 EP
 Safety Hatch (2015, Underslung Audio)
 Metal Jaws (2016, Bad Taste Recordings), on MethLab, Vol. 2
 Specialist (2016,  Inspected Records), on Glados EP
 Vertebrae (2016,  MethLab Recordings), on Monoleth 001 EP as Aethek

Remixes
 Krakpot (Billain Remix) (2012, Close 2 Death Recordings), original by Optiv
 Half Life (Billain Remix) (2013, Civil Music), original by Reso, released on Tangram Remixed
 Paradox (Billain Remix) (2014, Vandal Records), original by Opsen & Primal Therapy
 Ambers Love Was Like A Marble (Billain Remix) (2014, Med School Music), original by Rawtekk, released on Sprouted and Reformed
 Tetsuo's Redemption (Billain Remix) (2014, Owsla), original by KOAN Sound & Asa
 Mantra (Billain Remix) (2016, Mindtech LTD), original by AKOV
 Rethink (Billain Remix) (2016, Othercide Records), original by Current Value

Productions
 Odličan CD (2005, Menart Records), album by Frenkie; production of Outro
 Stig'o ćumur (2006, Fmjam Records, Menart Records), album by Edo Maajka; production of Sretno dijete, Za Mirzu, Blažena tišina and Severina/Fm Jam
 Štrajk mozga (2012, Fmjam Records, Menart Records), album by Edo Maajka; production of Panika, Facebook, Imaš li ti šta para, RaTaTa / Moj Dj and Gube Se
 Prodike (2014, JabbaTon Records), by Fil Tilen and P Money
 Igra riječi (2014, Fmjam Records), album by Kontra; production of Velepodaja
 Reexperience (2015, Fmjam Records, Menart Records), album by Frenkie; production of Film, S.C.A., Izgubljeni snovi, Mali od Ede and Gdje god su moji

Shortmovies
 Assembly (2014)
 Fugitive (2022)

Sound Design
 Pacific Rim Uprising (2018), additional synth programming
 Hunter Killer (2018), additional synth programming
 Scorn (2018), soundtrack and additional sound design

References

External links
 
 
 

Drum and bass musicians
Sound designers
Club DJs
Musicians from Sarajevo
Living people
Year of birth missing (living people)